Mickey Cantwell (born 23 November 1964) is a British former professional boxer who competed from 1991 to 2001. He challenged for multiple world titles; the WBO light flyweight and mini flyweight titles in 1997; and the IBF mini flyweight title in 2000. At regional level, he held the British flyweight title in 1996.

Career

Amateur
Born in London, Cantwell represented England in the light flyweight division at the 1990 Commonwealth Games in Auckland, New Zealand. Boxing for the Eltham & District ABC, he was twice winner of the prestigious ABA light-flyweight championship (1988 and 1989).

Professional
Cantwell turned professional in 1991 and, unbeaten in his first seven fights, beat Darren Fifield in April 1993 to take the vacant BBBofC Southern Area flyweight title. Five months later he challenged for Pablo Tiznado's WBC International light flyweight title, losing on points - his first professional defeat. In April 1994 he challenged for Luigi Camputaro's EBU European flyweight title, and again lost on points.

In March 1996 he faced Keith Knox for the vacant British flyweight title, winning on points to become British champion. Aiming for higher honours he relinquished the title, and in December 1997 faced Eric Jamili for the vacant WBO mini flyweight title; A cut to Cantwell's nose caused the fight to be stopped in the eighth round. In June 2000 he challenged Zolani Petelo for the IBF mini flyweight title, again stopped in the eighth round.

Cantwell had a small role in the 2000 film Snatch, playing Liam.

Cantwell's final fight came in September 2001 when he unsuccessfully challenged Jacob Matlala for the WBU light flyweight title, the South African stopping him in the fifth round.

After retiring from boxing, Cantwell served as Chief Executive of the Professional Boxing Association and as a project worker for the Educational Sports Forum.

After an incident in September 2008 in which Cantwell knocked his manager Alan Irwin out during an argument at the Trades Union Congress in Brighton, he was convicted of assault causing actual bodily harm and sentenced to 200 hours of unpaid work.

Cantwell became a patron of the Boxing Futures charity and in 2011 opened Cantwell's Gym in Bromley.

References

External links
Career record at boxrec.com

1964 births
Living people
English male boxers
Flyweight boxers
Light-flyweight boxers
Boxers from Greater London
Boxers at the 1990 Commonwealth Games
Commonwealth Games competitors for England